Jassem Ghazbanpour (Persian: جاسم غضبانپور) (born May 31, 1963) is an Iranian photographer.

Biography
Ghazbanpour began photographing in the field of social documentary in 1976. In his youth, his photography was attempting to record the circumstances and the daily life of the people of his birthplace.

In 1980, with the start of the Iran–Iraq War, he started photographing battlefields and the cities which had been affected by the war, to show the impact of it.

He has taken photographs from Afghanistan, (just after the fall of the Taliban), Iraq (Gulf War and Iraq War) and Iraqi Kurdistan (independence period).

Ghazbanpour earned his BA in the field of photography from Tehran University of Art (1983–1986).

After the war ended, Ghazbanpour started to take pictures of the culture, art, and the architecture of Iran, in all possible aspects, and he represented a new look of Iran in his works.
In addition to publishing several books in the war field (e.g. Chemical Massacre in Halabja, Sky and Earth: Tehran under missile attack), he has published many books about Iran (e.g. New Life-Old Structure, Iranian House, Iran from the Sky, The Splendor of Iran). In his background, he has numerous individual and group exhibitions in Iran and in other countries such as Indonesia, Japan, France, Italy. Additionally, many local and international magazines and newspapers have used his photos.

Bibliography

New life- old structure, a selection of valuable structures with plans (3 vol.), Ministry of Housing and Urban Development, 1st edition1992, 2nd edition1993
Sky and Earth: Tehran under missile attack, Research and planning center of Tehran, selected as “The war year book”, Tehran, 1997
Aqa Lotf’ Ali Souratgar-e-Shirazi: Biography and his works, Iran Cultural Heritage organization, 1997
Iranian House: introducing 50 Iranian valuable old houses with plans, National Organization of Housing 1996, Tiss publication, 2001
Iran from the Sky: aerial photos from different cities of Iran, Tiss Publication, fall 2000
The Splendor of Iran (3 volumes), Booth Clibborn, England, 2001
Life and works of Sani–ol–Molk, Iran University Press (IUP), Tehran, 2003
Bam: photo Report on Bam before and after the earthquake, Tiss publication, 1st 2003, 2nd 2004
A Review on the Iran music background based on pre-Islamic remain objects, Iran Cultural Heritage organization, spring 2004
Splendors of Quran Calligraphy & Illumination, Contributor: Martin Lings, Photographs by Jassem Ghazbanpour, Thesaurus Islamicus Foundation, Thames & Hudson, London, Dec. 2005
Splendor of Khuzestan, Tiss Publication, 2009
Contemporary Architecture of Iran: 75 years of public building experience- from 1921 to 1996 Ministry of Housing and Urban Development, 2009
City eyewitnesses: selection of wall paintings and sculptures of Tehran, Tiss Publication, 2010

Photo reports
The Independent, pictorial report of Kurds of Iraq, No. 1384, Saturday Mar.23, London, 1991
Time International, pictorial report of the Kurds of Iraq, vol. 137, No. 13, April 1, 1991
ABC, victims of Chemical attack in Iran- Iraq War, Sep.28, Madrid, 1996
El Pais, Victimas olvidadas de Saddam (Victims of Chemical attack in Sardasht, Kurdistan), P. 20, Madrid, Feb.18, 2007
El Pais, Religious Minorities in Iran, Jews, p. 4, Madrid, April 9, 2007
El Pais, Marriage Dating Agency, P. 46, Madrid, Oct.7, 2007
El Pais, woman's Futsal team exercises with Spanish trainer, P. 35, Madrid, Nov.12, 2007
El Pais, interview with Masoumeh Ebtekar (Tehran City Council Member), P. 8, Madrid, Dec.14, 2006
El Pais, interview with Mohammad Ali Abtahi (Center for Interreligious Dialogue & Civilization), Madrid, Dec.18, 2007
AD: Architectural Design, Iran: past, present, future, No. 217, P. 18 Khajo Bridge, 20 Shazde Garden, 21 Fin garden,42 Chelsoton palace, 43 Ibn sina mausoleum (above)& Tehran museum of contemporary arts below,76–77 Azadi square, London, May / June 2012

Exhibitions

36 million people City (To celebrate the 2nd anniversary of the Khorramshahr liberation), Solo Exhibition, Tehran University of Art, May 1984
The 2nd Annual photo exhibition, Group Exhibition, Tehran Museum of Contemporary Art, Nov.1988
The 3rd Annual photo exhibition, Group Exhibition, Tehran Museum of Contemporary Art, Feb. 1989
The 1st Journalistic photos exhibition, Group Exhibition, Tehran Museum of Contemporary Art, Dec 1990
The 4th Annual photo exhibition, Group Exhibition, Tehran Museum of Contemporary Art, Jan. 1991
Tehran under missile attack, Solo exhibition, District 1 gallery, Tehran Research and Planning Center, Feb 1996
Paradise, the Lost, Group exhibition, Seyhoon Gallery, Tehran, Dec.1996
Aerial Photos, Solo exhibition, District 1 gallery, Tehran Research and Planning Center, Jan. 1999
Regards Persans – une revolution photographique", Group exhibition, Paris Musees, June 20- August 31, 2001 
Iran, Group exhibition, Silk Road Gallery, Tehran, 2002
Splendor of Iranian Garden: Iranian Garden photos and plans, Solo Exhibition, Ministry of Housing and Urban Development lobby, Sep. 2004
SOS- world heritage, Group exhibition, UNESCO and NHK, Tokyo international university of fine art and music, Japan, 2006
Iranian Lady, Group exhibition, Municipal Paris, April 2008
Tehran Documented, Group exhibition, Aran Gallery, July 2010
Requiem for Innocence, Group exhibition, Aran Gallery, Sept. 2011
Iran Modern, Group exhibition, Asia Society Museum, New York, Sep. 2013 – Jan. 2014
UNEDITED HISTORY, Iran 1960–2014, Group exhibition, Musée d'Art Moderne de la Ville de Paris, Paris, May- Aug. 2014
UNEDITED HISTORY, Iran 1960–2014, Group exhibition, MAXXI museum, Rome, Italy, December 10, 2014 March 29, 2015

Awards

 1985 2nd place Graphic photography, 4th Iranian young Cinema Festival-Tehran
 1987 3rd place, The 4th Education from view of images photo competition-Tehran
 1990 Merit Certificate, "world in Focus", International photo competition, Red Cross, Red Crescent Magazine, International Federation of Red Cross and Red Crescent Societies
 1991 3rd place, "1st Journalistic photos exhibition"
 2004 "Active Photographer of the year" award, "Iranian Photographers house"
 2006 "Active Photographer of the year" award, "Iranian Photographers house"
 2008 Honor plaque for the best work, "The 2nd Festival of top research and innovation in the urban management"
 2008 Appreciated for cooperating in "Photo Expo" with "Art Academy"
 2008 Appreciated in, "The 11th Holly Defense year book festival" for publishing the book: "Eye Witnesses of the Time"

Film Photography

And Life Goes On, Abbas Kiarostami, 1992
The pear tree, Dariush Mehrjoui, 1998

Membership in Professional Groups and Associations

Fine Arts developing Institute
National Association of Photography
Photographers Association of crisis, Iran
Iran Press Photographers Association
Iran Cultural Heritage Photographers Association
Caroun Photo Club (CPC), Vancouver, Canada
Canadian Association for Photographic Art (CAPA)

References

External links
 Jassem Ghazbanpour official website
 The Splendor of Iran Book Review

1963 births
Living people
Iranian photographers